is a village located in Takaichi District, Nara Prefecture, Japan.

Asuka is the land where ancient  palaces were located. There are strict rules governing construction in this historic town.

Asuka can be reached from Okadera or Asuka Station on Kintetsu Yoshino Line train line. Although it's outside Asuka, Kashiharajingū-mae Station in neighboring Kashihara has service on the Kintetsu Kashihara Line, Minami Osaka Line and Yoshino Lines. By car, Asuka is on Route 169.

History 
For the ancient Asuka, see Asuka period and Asuka, Yamato.

In 1956, the village of Asuka (明日香) was founded as a result of a merger of three villages, Sakaai, Takechi and Asuka (飛鳥村).

In 1966, Asuka was proclaimed a "historic town", as defined by the national Special Arrangement for Preservation of Historic Sites Law  as well as Kyoto, Nara and Kamakura. The law restricts constructions and other civil engineering operations in the designated areas due preservation of the historic sites. In 1967, a part of Asuka, around 391ha in area, was designated as a historic site for preservation. Along with this decision, the government planned to build Asuka  National Historic Park, for which construction was launched in 1966 and finished in 1994.

In 1972, a site with colorfully painted murals from the late Asuka period was found in the Takamatsuzuka Tomb.

Since the Special Arrangement for Preservation of Historic Sites Law (1966) restricts any visual changes in the areas which it concerns, it has directly affected the daily life of  residents. To preserve the site, they have had to give up some elements of modern life. As compensation, the  Asuka Law, which aims to preserve the site effectively and give economic support for Asuka residents, was settled in 1980.

Asuka stones and kofun 
In various parts of the Asuka region are unusual carved granite stones the largest of which is Masuda no iwafune. The upper surface is flat, with a shallow trough and two square holes. This is located on top of a hill just a few hundred meters west of Okadera Station. How or why this colossal stone and others was carved remains a mystery. They appear to be a different style than later Buddhist sculptures.

There are also several nearby kofuns or tombs including the Ishibutai Kofun which is built from massive boulders including one that weighs an estimated 75 tons. This may have been the tomb of Soga no Umako.

Surrounding municipalities
 Nara Prefecture
 Kashihara
 Sakurai
 Takatori
 Yoshino

Places of interest
Temples
 Asuka-dera
 Oka-dera, aka Ryūgai-ji - Kansai Kannon Pilgrimage No.7
 Tachibana-dera
 Kameishi (Turtle Rock)
 Ishibutai Kofun
 Kitora Kofun
 Takamatsuzuka Kofun
 Amakashinooka

Sister cities
  Buyeo County, South Korea

See also
 Capital of Japan
 Prince Shōtoku
 List of megalithic sites

References

External links

 Village of Asuka 
 

 
Villages in Nara Prefecture